"At the End of the Day / Backbone" is a double A-side single by Baby Animals. It was released in October 1993 as the second single from their second studio album Shaved and Dangerous (1993).
The song peaked at number 60 on the ARIA Chart.

"At the End of the Day" is entirely sung in French except for the Chorus line "At the end of the day the sun goes down".

Track listing
CD single (743211681025)
 "At the End of the Day" – 2:52
 "Backbone" – 5:17
 "Wodge" (Live) – 3:13
 "One Too Many" (Live) – 5:28
 "Ain't Gonna Get" (Live) – 3:35

 Tracks 3 to 5 Recorded live at Newcastle Civic Theatre in June 1992.

Charts

External links

References

1993 songs
1993 singles
Baby Animals songs
Songs written by Suze DeMarchi
Song recordings produced by Ed Stasium